Le Journal du Dimanche, also known as the JDD  is a French weekly newspaper published on Sundays in France.

History and profile
Le Journal du Dimanche was created by Pierre Lazareff in 1948. He was managing editor of France Soir at that time.

The weekly paper belongs to the Lagardère Group through Hachette Filipacchi Médias. The company is also the publisher of the paper which is based in Paris and which is published on Sundays.

Le Journal du Dimanche was published in broadsheet format until 1999 when it began to be published in the Berliner format. On 6 March 2011 the paper again changed its format and became published in large tabloid format.

In the period of 2001-2002, Le Journal du Dimanche had a circulation of 275,000 copies. Its 2009, circulation was 269,000 copies. Between January and December 2010, the paper had a circulation of 257,280 copies.

In 2020, Le Journal du Dimanche had a circulation of 151,007 copies.

Staff
 Alain Genestar
 Jean-Claude Maurice between 1999 and December 2005.
 Jacques Espérandieu (ex-Le Parisien) between December 2005 and May 2008.
 Christian de Villeneuve between May 2008 and February 2010
 Olivier Jay between March 2010 and December 2011
 Jerôme Bellay since January 2012

References

Article on the French Wikipedia.

External links
 Official website

Newspapers published in Paris
Sunday newspapers
Weekly newspapers published in France
Lagardère Active
Publications established in 1948
1948 establishments in France